Acrobasis canella is a species of snout moth in the genus Acrobasis. It was described by Hiroshi Yamanaka in 2003. It is found in Japan.

References

Moths described in 2003
Endemic fauna of Japan
Acrobasis
Moths of Japan